Hurstbourne Tarrant is a village and civil parish in Hampshire, England. It lies to the north of the county in the Test Valley.
The Tarrant part of the name originates from 1226, when the village was given to the Cistercian Tarrant nunnery.  The civil parish includes the village of Ibthorpe.

During the Second World War, Hurstbourne Tarrant was the decoy site for RAF Andover, the headquarters of RAF Maintenance Command. This was one of four airfields in Hampshire to be given a decoy site in 1940, to deceive enemy aircraft into attacking a spurious target. The decoy site at Hurstbourne Tarrant was a type 'K' decoy site with fake aircraft and buildings. From September 1940, fake machine gun posts were added to Hurstbourne Tarrant.

The famous American Victorian/Edwardian artist Anna Lea Merritt lived in the village for many years.

William Cobbett declared Hurstbourne Tarrent and its location as worth going miles to see with beauty at every turn. He referred to it in his book Rural Rides (1830; but serialised from 1822) as Uphusband.

Hurstbourne House
Hurstbourne House is a grade II listed late 17th-century country house at the edge of the village. It was renovated in the late 18th and early 19th centuries. It is home to the Sharpe family. The original central range was built in two storeys, and has 19th century three-storey cross wings at each end. The walls are stucco rendered and the roof tiled. The frontage has three bays, the central one recessed.

See also
 Test Valley
 RAF Andover
 Starfish site

References

External links

Villages in Hampshire